Johnny Bothwell (May 23, 1919 – September 12, 1995) was an American jazz alto saxophonist and bandleader.

Career 
Bothwell played in Chicago in 1940 and then moved to New York City, playing with Woody Herman (1943) and Sonny Dunham (1944–46). He was a key member and featured soloist of Boyd Raeburn's groups in 1944–1945, and played with Gene Krupa in 1945. He formed his own groups between 1945 and 1949, and held a residency at the Tin Pan Alley Club in Chicago as well as in New York and Boston.

Bothwell gave up music after 1949 and moved to Miami. He owned a number of bands but did not return to playing for the rest of his life.

References

American jazz bandleaders
American jazz saxophonists
American male saxophonists
Big band bandleaders
Musicians from Indiana
1919 births
1995 deaths
20th-century American saxophonists
20th-century American male musicians
American male jazz musicians